The City of Idaho Springs is the Statutory City that is the most populous municipality in Clear Creek County, Colorado, United States. Idaho Springs is a part of the Denver–Aurora–Lakewood, CO Metropolitan Statistical Area. As of the 2010 census it had a population of 1,717.

Founded  in 1859 by prospectors during the early days of the Pike's Peak Gold Rush, the town was at the center of the region's mining district throughout the late nineteenth century. The Argo Tunnel drained and provided access to many lodes of ore between Idaho Springs and Central City. During the late twentieth century, the town evolved into a tourist center along U.S. Highway 6 and U.S. Highway 40, which ascend Clear Creek Canyon through the historic mining district.

The town today is squeezed along the north side of Interstate 70, with a historical downtown in the central portion, a strip of tourist-related businesses on its eastern end, and mostly residences on its western end. It also serves as a bedroom community for workers at the Loveland Ski Area farther up the canyon. The town today is the largest community in Clear Creek County, but, for historical reasons, the county seat has remained at Georgetown.

History

On January 5, 1859, during the Colorado gold rush, prospector George A. Jackson discovered placer gold at the present site of Idaho Springs, where Chicago Creek empties into Clear Creek. It was the first substantial gold discovery in Colorado. Jackson, a Missouri native with experience in the California gold fields, was drawn to the area by clouds of steam rising from some nearby hot springs. Jackson kept his find secret for several months, but after he paid for some supplies with gold dust, others rushed to Jackson's diggings. The location was originally known as "Jackson's Diggings". Once the location became a permanent settlement, it was variously called "Sacramento City", "Idahoe", "Idaho", "Idaho City", and finally "Idaho Springs".

The first placer discoveries were soon followed by discoveries of gold veins in the rocks of the canyon walls on both sides of Clear Creek. Hard rock mining became the mainstay of the town long after the gold-bearing gravels were exhausted.

The Idaho Springs miners' strike of 1903 demanding an eight-hour day erupted into violence in May 1903. This was a conflict was a part the much broader Colorado Labor Wars, where the Western Federation of Miners sought to pressure mining companies into improving conditions for miners.

The 1969 film Downhill Racer portrayed an alpine ski racer from Idaho Springs, played by Robert Redford; a brief scene was shot on location in Idaho Springs. Several scenes from the comedy film The Overbrook Brothers were filmed here in the spring of 2008.

Geography

Idaho Springs is located in northeastern Clear Creek County along Clear Creek near the confluence of its tributary, Chicago Creek.

Climate
Idaho Springs has a humid continental climate (Koppen: Dfb) with moderately cold winters and warm summers with cool nights. Annual snowfall is heavy, averaging 72 inches (183 cm).

Demographics

As of the census of 2010, there were 1,717 people and 934 housing units. As of the census of 2000, there were 485 families residing in the city. The racial makeup of the city was 94.71% White, 0.74% Black or African American, 1.06% Native American, 0.48% Asian, 1.54% from other races, and 1.48% from two or more races. 5.03% of the population were Hispanic or Latino of any race.

There were 841 households, out of which 27.1% had children under the age of 18 living with them, 42.8% were married couples living together, 10.9% had a female householder with no husband present, and 42.3% were non-families. 33.2% of all households were made up of individuals, and 8.4% had someone living alone who was 65 years of age or older. The average household size was 2.25 and the average family size was 2.87.

In the city, the population was spread out, with 23.1% under the age of 18, 9.1% from 18 to 24, 30.3% from 25 to 44, 28.0% from 45 to 64, and 9.5% who were 65 years of age or older. The median age was 39 years. For every 100 females, there were 105.5 males. For every 100 females age 18 and over, there were 103.9 males.

The median income for a household in the city was $39,643, and the median income for a family was $48,790. Males had a median income of $35,446 versus $22,688 for females. The per capita income for the city was $20,789. About 2.2% of families and 6.7% of the population were below the poverty line, including 5.4% of those under age 18 and 13.4% of those age 65 or over.

Education
Idaho Springs Public Schools are part of the Clear Creek School District RE-1. There are two elementary schools, one middle school, one high school, and one charter school. Students attend Clear Creek High School.

Carlson Elementary School is located in Idaho Springs.

Karen Quanbeck is the Interim Superintendent of Schools.

Transportation
Idaho Springs is incorporated into the  Colorado Department of Transportation's Bustang network. It is part of the West Line, which connects Denver to Grand Junction.

Gallery

Cultural References

In the movie Downhill Racer, Idaho Springs was referenced as the hometown of fictional character Dave Chappellet (Robert Redford). On-location shots of Idaho Springs were used in the film.

Beaus of Holly, a made-for-TV Christmas movie produced in 2020 for the ION Channel, was filmed in Idaho Springs.

The video game Life Is Strange: True Colors used Idaho Springs as the inspiration for the main setting of the game Haven Springs.

Notable people
Gus Alberts, Major League Baseball player
Joseph H. August, cinematographer
Warren A. Haggott, U.S. Representative from Colorado
Paul M. Lewis, entrepreneur and car builder
Pete Morrison, silent western film actor
Jennifer Whalen, professional mountain bike racer who has resided in Idaho Springs since 2002
Haleigh Washington, Olympic Gold medalist in Women’s Volleyball at 2020 Summer Olympics

Points of interest
 Argo Gold Mine and Mill - The mill and museum are open for tours.
 Statue of cartoon character Steve Canyon
 The Charlie Taylor Water Wheel - a water wheel built by miner Charlie Taylor in 1893 to power a stamp mill.  Moved to its present location south of US 6 and US 40 in 1948 and restored in 1988. Fed by Bridal Veil Falls, a small waterfall, visible to the south of eastbound I-70.
 Mount Evans - The mountain is located about 28 miles south of Idaho Springs.
 Indian Hot Springs

See also

Outline of Colorado
Index of Colorado-related articles
State of Colorado
Colorado cities and towns
List of municipalities in Colorado
Colorado counties
Clear Creek County, Colorado
National Register of Historic Places listings in Clear Creek County, Colorado
List of statistical areas in Colorado
Front Range Urban Corridor
North Central Colorado Urban Area
Denver-Aurora-Boulder, CO Combined Statistical Area
Denver-Aurora-Broomfield, CO Metropolitan Statistical Area
Arapaho National Forest
Pike's Peak Gold Rush

References

External links

 City of Idaho Springs official website
 CDOT map of the City of Idaho Springs
 Idaho Springs Photos and Information at Western Mining History

Cities in Clear Creek County, Colorado
Cities in Colorado
Denver metropolitan area
Populated places established in 1859
Hot springs of Colorado
Bodies of water of Clear Creek County, Colorado
1859 establishments in Kansas Territory